The Alabama A&M Bulldogs and Lady Bulldogs are the athletic teams that represent Alabama Agricultural and Mechanical University. The program features 15 varsity sports teams. They participate in the National Collegiate Athletic Association's Division I as a member of the Southwestern Athletic Conference. Russell Athletic is the current sponsor of the Alabama A&M University Athletic Department.

History

National championships

Individual sports

Baseball

The Alabama A&M Bulldogs transitioned from Division II to NCAA Division I in 1999. The lone Bulldogs baseball conference title came in 1993 in the Southern Intercollegiate Athletic Conference.

Football

The Alabama A&M Bulldogs are the college football team representing the Alabama Agricultural and Mechanical University. The Bulldogs play in the NCAA Division I Football Championship Subdivision.

Basketball

The Alabama A&M Bulldogs basketball team has had notable players including Desmond Cambridge, Mickell Gladness, Obie Trotter, Frank Sillmon, Willie Hayes (basketball), and Nigel Moore (basketball). The Bulldogs were coached by L. Vann Pettaway from 1986 to 2010. During that span, Pettaway amassed a 440–264 record with the a school-best 28–3 in 1992-93 and 1995–96. From 1992 to 1997, the Bulldogs went 136–20. 
The Alabama A&M Bulldogs men's basketball team has made the NCAA tournament once, in 2005.

Soccer
Alabama A&M's men's soccer team won two NCAA Division II national championships in 1977 and 1979, finished Third place in 1980, and was runner-up in Division I in 1981.  The program was discontinued following the 2011 season.

References

External Links